Gargar-e Sofla (also Romanized as Gargar-e Soflá; also known as Gargar, Gazgaz, Gorgor, Gor Gor, and Gor Gor-e Pā’īn) is a village in Hoseyni Rural District, in the Central District of Shadegan County, Khuzestan Province, Iran. At the 2006 census, its population was 176, in 38 families.

References 

Populated places in Shadegan County